Robert James Henry Love (20 July 1896 – 15 March 1960) was an Australian rules footballer who played with Melbourne in the Victorian Football League (VFL). Brother of Percy Love.

Notes

External links 

 

1896 births
1960 deaths
Australian rules footballers from Melbourne
Melbourne Football Club players
Prahran Football Club players
People from South Yarra, Victoria